Events from the year 1787 in Russia

Incumbents
 Monarch – Catherine II

Events
 Black Sea Cossack Host  formed
 Crimean journey of Catherine the Great
 Russo-Turkish War (1787–92) begins
 Battle of Kinburn (1787)
 Lomonosov Bridge completed in Saint Petersburg

Births
 Alexander Alyabyev - composer
 Grigol Bagration of Mukhrani - Georgian nobleman, Russian officer
 Konstantin Batyushkov - poet, essayist, and translator
 Jean Armand de Lestocq - French doctor, adventurer, and courtier
 Alexander Ivanovich Dmitriev-Mamonov - general and painter of battle scenes
 Nikolay Gretsch - writer, grammarian, and journalist
 Semyon Korsakov - homeopath and inventor
 Michael Lunin - political philosopher, revolutionary
 Alexander Sergeyevich Menshikov -  nobleman, general, government official
 Ivan Nabokov - general
 Alexey Fyodorovich Orlov - general, diplomat, and statesman
 Antony Pogorelsky - writer 
 Alexandr Mikhailovich Potemkin - nobleman and soldier, patron of the Holy Mountains Lavra monastery
 Nymphodora Semenova - opera singer
 Aleksei Sokolov - priest who lived in Russian Alaska
 Pavel Svinyin - writer, painter, editor
 Aleksandr Vitberg - architect
 Otto von Kotzebue - navy captain, explorer
 Maksim Vorobyov - landscape painter
 Yekaterina Yezhova - actress and socialite

Deaths
 Alexei Antonovich of Brunswick - member of the royal family
 Alexei Turchaninov - businessman

References

1787 in Russia
Years of the 18th century in the Russian Empire